Claryville is an unincorporated community and census-designated place (CDP) in Campbell County, Kentucky, United States. The population was 2,355 at the 2010 census.

History
Claryville was named for the Clary family of pioneer settlers.

Geography
Claryville is located in southwestern Campbell County at  (38.928983, −84.401744). Its western border, Pond Creek Road, runs along the Licking River, which forms the Kenton County line. U.S. Route 27 (Alexandria Pike) is a four-lane highway that passes through the eastern part of Claryville, leading north through Alexandria  to downtown Cincinnati, Ohio, and south  to Falmouth.

Demographics

As of the census of 2000, there were 2,588 people, 942 households, and 725 families residing in the CDP. The racial makeup of the CDP was 99.11% White, 0.27% African American, 0.12% Native American, 0.12% Asian, 0.08% from other races, and 0.31% from two or more races. Hispanic or Latino of any race were 0.46% of the population.

There were 942 households, out of which 38.2% had children under the age of 18 living with them, 63.4% were married couples living together, 9.4% had a female householder with no husband present, and 23.0% were non-families. 18.8% of all households were made up of individuals, and 4.7% had someone living alone who was 65 years of age or older. The average household size was 2.75 and the average family size was 3.14.

In the CDP, the population was spread out, with 26.2% under the age of 18, 11.1% from 18 to 24, 30.4% from 25 to 44, 23.6% from 45 to 64, and 8.7% who were 65 years of age or older. The median age was 35 years. For every 100 females, there were 100.2 males. For every 100 females age 18 and over, there were 97.0 males.

The median income for a household in the CDP was $49,231, and the median income for a family was $52,083. Males had a median income of $39,150 versus $27,500 for females. The per capita income for the CDP was $21,367. About 3.7% of families and 4.6% of the population were below the poverty line, including 4.8% of those under age 18 and none of those age 65 or over.

Education
Residents are within the Campbell County School District. Residents are zoned to Campbell County High School in Claryville, Kentucky

References

Census-designated places in Campbell County, Kentucky
Census-designated places in Kentucky